China Merchants Bank Tower, or the Shenzhen World Trade Centre a 53-story skyscraper in Futian District, Shenzhen, Guangdong Province, China was designed by American architecture firm Lee / Timchula of New York City. Lee / Timchula was the continuation of the Edward Larrabee Barnes, John MY Lee Architecture firm after Barnes retired in 1993. Completed in 2001.

The 53 story high tower is defined by three zones-the podium, the tapering tower shaft, and the crown. The podium is a simple, 5-story rectangular volume with clear glass and 2 tones of gray granite detailed in sleek flush planes. The podium contains a full height atrium and a grand banking hall. Above the main shaft is a sky garden where refreshments are served at the Bankers Club in the crown zone above.

The exact location is at the intersection of  Nongyuan Road (Chinese:农园路; Pinyin: Nóngyuán Lù) and Shennan Boulevard (Chinese:深南大道; Pinyin: Shēnnán Dàdào), a major east-west thoroughfare of Shenzhen.

History 
Completed in 2001, the global headquarters of China Merchants Bank is located within the tower.

Transportation 
Shenzhen Metro: Chegongmiao Station

See also

 List of tallest buildings in Shenzhen

References

External links

 Emporis Building Profile 
 www.cmbchina.com 

2001 establishments in China
Futian District
Skyscraper office buildings in Shenzhen
Office buildings completed in 2001